Sidney Raymond Kenneth Nelson (born 1 January 1996) is an English professional footballer who plays as a centre back for Welling United on loan from National League club Woking.

Career
Nelson was born in Lewisham, Greater London. He first signed for Millwall at the age of eight. He was captain of their youth team, and turned professional in August 2014. He made his senior debut for them on 28 December 2014. He was praised by manager Ian Holloway as the team's "best player" in that match. Nelson stated it was a "dream" to play for the club his family supports.

On 4 January 2017, Nelson joined League Two side Newport County on loan until the end of the 2016–17 season. He made his debut on 7 January, playing the full 90 minutes in a 1–3 away league defeat at Stevenage. Nelson was part of the Newport squad that completed the 'Great Escape' with a 2–1 victory at home to Notts County on the final day of the 2016–17 season, which ensured Newport's survival in League Two.

On 21 August 2017, Nelson signed for League Two club Yeovil Town on loan until January 2018. He moved on loan to Chesterfield in January 2018.

He was offered a new contract by Millwall at the end of the 2017–18 season. He moved on loan to Swindon Town in August 2018.

In January 2019, Nelson joined League Two side Tranmere Rovers on loan until the end of the 2018–19 season.

In May 2019, it was announced that Nelson would be one of five players released by Millwall when their contracts expired.

In June 2019 he signed a two-year contract with Tranmere Rovers.

On 9 July 2021, Nelson joined Northampton Town on a one-year deal. He suffered an injury in training in September 2021, a situation he described as a "nightmare".

On 13 July 2022, Nelson agreed to join National League side, Woking on a one-year deal. On 18 October 2022, Nelson joined National League South club Welling United on a one-month loan deal.

Career statistics

Honours
Tranmere Rovers
EFL League Two play-offs: 2019

References

1996 births
Living people
Footballers from Lewisham
English footballers
Association football defenders
Millwall F.C. players
Newport County A.F.C. players
Yeovil Town F.C. players
Chesterfield F.C. players
Swindon Town F.C. players
Tranmere Rovers F.C. players
Northampton Town F.C. players
Woking F.C. players
Welling United F.C. players
English Football League players
National League (English football) players